Zieman is a surname. Notable people with the surname include:

Isaac Zieman (1920–2007), Latvian Holocaust survivor
Lyle Zieman (1921–2003), American politician
Mark Zieman (born 1945), American politician
Nancy Zieman (1953–2017), American author and designer

See also
Ziemann